Sacrificial Cake is the second studio album by Jarboe. It was released in 1995 through Alternative Tentacles, and is an accompaniment to Drainland by fellow Swans member Michael Gira.

Track listing

Personnel 
Musicians
Jarboe – vocals, keyboards, guitar, bass guitar, tape, production
Michael Gira – acoustic guitar (4), mixing, design
Lary Seven – electric guitar, double bass, percussion, engineering
Michael Evans – drums (2, 15, 16)

Production and additional personnel
Chris Griffin – mastering
Berry Kamer – production and recording (4)
Clinton Steele – mixing
Deryk Thomas – painting

References

External links 
 

1995 albums
Alternative Tentacles albums
Jarboe albums